KOHN (91.9 FM) is a radio station licensed to serve Sells, Arizona, United States.  The station is owned by the Tohono O'odham Nation. It airs a Community radio format.

The station was assigned the KOHN call letters by the Federal Communications Commission on December 14, 2000. KOHN began Internet streaming on June 1, 2011.

KOHN is relayed on KOHH 90.7 in San Lucy, Arizona. The Tohono O'odham Nation also operates low-power stations in Florence Community (KOHF-LP 101.1) and San Xavier (KWAK-LP 102.5).

See also
 List of community radio stations in the United States

References

External links
 KOHN website
 
 
 

OHN
Community radio stations in the United States
Native American radio
Mass media in Pima County, Arizona
Tohono O'odham culture